"Nem Eu" is a song performed by Portuguese singer Salvador Sobral. The song was released in Portugal as a digital download on 27 October 2016 as the second single from his debut studio album Excuse Me (2016). The song peaked at number 25 on the Portuguese Singles Chart.

It is a contemporary cover of the song written and sung by the Brazilian top artist Dorival Caymmi in 1952.

Music video
A music video to accompany the release of "Nem Eu" was first released onto YouTube on 1 November 2016 at a total length of three minutes and twelve seconds.

Track listing

Charts

Release history

References

2016 songs
2016 singles